Brigitte Wagner (born November 22, 1983, in Freising, West Germany) is a retired amateur German freestyle wrestler, who competed in the women's flyweight category. Considering one of the world's top female freestyle wrestlers in her decade, Wagner has claimed a gold and a silver medal in the 48-kg division at the World Championships, and seized an opportunity to compete for Germany at the 2004 Summer Olympics. Throughout her sporting career, Wagner trained full-time as a member of the wrestling squad for Siegfried Sports Club in Hallbergmoos, under her coach and four-time Olympian Jürgen Scheibe.

Wagner made sporting headlines, as an 18-year-old teen, at the 2001 World Wrestling Championships in Sofia, Bulgaria, where she took home the bronze medal in the women's 46-kg division. Wagner's early success in wrestling blossomed her career, as she dominated both the 2002 World and 2003 European Championships with two unprecedented gold medals produced in her hardware.

When women's wrestling made its debut at the 2004 Summer Olympics in Athens, Wagner seized her opportunity to compete in the inaugural 48 kg class. Earlier in the process, she outclassed Russia's Liliya Kaskarakova to snatch both the trophy and Olympic ticket from the Olympic Qualification Tournament in Tunis, Tunisia. She was powerfully pinned by Japan's Chiharu Icho with only two seconds left in the second period during her opening match, but managed to score a 4–3 sudden-death victory over Canada's Lyndsay Belisle in the prelim pool. Despite missing a spot for the semifinals, Wagner wrestled her way to pin Mongolia's Tsogtbazaryn Enkhjargal in a consolation round, before losing out to Russia's Lorisa Oorzhak with a 1–3 decision for a fifth-place finish.

References

External links
 

1983 births
Living people
German female sport wrestlers
Olympic wrestlers of Germany
Wrestlers at the 2004 Summer Olympics
People from Freising
Sportspeople from Upper Bavaria
World Wrestling Championships medalists
European Wrestling Championships medalists
20th-century German women
21st-century German women